Looney Tunes Showcase: Volume 1 is a Blu-ray disc announced by Warner Home Video. It was released on January 10, 2012. It contains 25 Looney Tunes and Merrie Melodies shorts and numerous supplements. It is a separate release of Disc 1 of the Looney Tunes Platinum Collection: Volume 1. This will be the series for Looney Tunes and Merrie Melodies cartoons in standard Blu-ray cases. But due to low budgets in remastering the shorts, the Looney Tunes Showcase lineup was discontinued.

Contents

Special features

Behind the Tunes
 Wagnerian Wabbit: The Making of What's Opera, Doc?
 Twilight in Tunes: The Music of Raymond Scott
 Powerhouse in Pictures
 Putty Problems and Canary Rows
 A Chuck Jones Tutorial: Tricks of the Cartoon Trade
 The Charm of Stink: On the Scent of Pepé le Pew

References

Looney Tunes home video releases